Quote is an extinct town in Carroll County, in the U.S. state of Missouri. The GNIS classifies it as a populated place.

A post office called Quote was established in 1892, and remained in operation until 1919. The source of the name Quote is obscure.

References

Ghost towns in Missouri
Former populated places in Carroll County, Missouri